Takashi Yorino (born 10 October 1950) is a Japanese former racing driver who placed 20th overall and won the GTP class in the 1990 24 Hours of Le Mans driving a Mazda 767.

References

1950 births
Living people
Japanese racing drivers
IMSA GT Championship drivers
24 Hours of Le Mans drivers
World Sportscar Championship drivers

Long Distance Series drivers
Oreca drivers